Stephen Tenenbaum is an American film producer.

In 2012, he was nominated for an Academy Award for the 2011 movie Midnight in Paris.

Filmography
 The Curse of the Jade Scorpion (2001) (executive producer)
 Hollywood Ending (2002) (executive producer)
 Anything Else (2003) (executive producer)
 Melinda and Melinda (2004) (executive producer)
 Match Point (2005) (executive producer)
 Scoop (2006) (executive producer)
 Cassandra's Dream (2007)
 Vicky Cristina Barcelona (2008)
 Whatever Works (2009)
 You Will Meet A Tall Dark Stranger (2010)
 Midnight in Paris (2011)
 To Rome with Love (2012)
 Blue Jasmine (2013)
 Magic in the Moonlight (2014)
 Irrational Man (2015)
 Café Society (2016)
 Wonder Wheel (2017)

References

External links

Living people
American film producers
Year of birth missing (living people)
Place of birth missing (living people)